The 2022 Germany Tri-Nation Series was a Twenty20 International (T20I) cricket tournament that was held in Germany from 9 to 12 June 2022. The participating teams were the hosts Germany, along with Austria and Sweden, and all matches were played at the Bayer Uerdingen Cricket Ground in Krefeld.

Germany and Austria each won three of their four round-robin matches to progress to the final, where the Germans won by three wickets with two balls to spare.

Squads

Round-robin

Points Table

 Advanced to the final

Fixtures

Final

References

External links
 Series home at ESPNCricinfo

Associate international cricket competitions in 2022
Germany Tri-Nation Series